Mare Advertencia Lirika is a rapper and songwriter who was born on January 14, 1987 in Oaxaca, Mexico. She is an indigenous woman of Zapotecan descent.

Biography

Lirika became involved in the Hip-hop music community in 2003 when she joined the group OCG as a rapper and singer. OCG later branched out and Advertencia Lirika was formed, a female group in Oaxaca.

Music

Lirika's first major involvement with the hip hop community was with OCG. In 2004, it branched out to her, and a trio of its members decided to form a collective project called Advertencia Lirika. Following its formation, its members Luna, Itza, and Lirika played their music at local and national events. In 2007, they released their first CD titled "3 Reinas" (3 Queens). They continued their collective work until 2009, when the group decided to break up and follow individual careers. 
Since then, Mare has continued to do solo work and focus on her independent career. However, she still works in collectives and promotes the work and music of women. In 2010, she released her first EP as a soloist, "Que mujer!" (What a Woman), a seven-song collection that focuses on injustices against indigenous women. In 2010 she was involved in a compilation, "Salir A Las Calles," that disseminates political imprisonment in Mexico.

Discography

References

 
 
 
 
 
 

Living people
People from Oaxaca
Zapotec people
Mexican hip hop musicians
Mexican women singer-songwriters
Mexican singer-songwriters
Indigenous Mexican women
21st-century Native Americans
Women in Latin music
1987 births